Vietnamese Brazilians are a small community in Brazil consisting of approximately 150–200 permanent residents of Vietnamese ancestry. Many of these residents are the "boat people" who emigrated from Vietnam following the Fall of Saigon – the capture of the South Vietnamese capital by the North Vietnamese communist regime under Ho Chi Minh. Today, the community remains relatively obscure in Vietnam and among other Vietnamese communities abroad.

History

There is no official record of Vietnamese immigrants migrating to Brazil prior to 1989, the year when Vietnam and Brazil initiated formal diplomatic relations.

According to a report from a major daily Vietnamese newspaper, Tuổi Trẻ, there had been three Vietnamese academics and professors who taught at the University of São Paulo in the 1950s. A few documents about immigration research such as the Cebri and the História da Marinha Mercante documented three main waves of almost 150 Vietnamese immigrants. These three waves received aid and eventually citizenship from the Brazilian government. Most of these immigrants were boat people seeking asylum after the Fall of Saigon; they had been found and rescued by a Brazilian oil ship near the Philippines.

The first wave consisted of over 50 people arriving in Brazil around February 1979. The second wave of 26 immigrants arrived in September of the same year. The third wave, a group of 10, arrived in the early 1980s.
The Vietnamese were reported to have had trouble adapting to their adopted country. Among the most prominent of these troubles was the communication barrier between them and the native Brazilians: learning Portuguese proved to be a difficult task for the Vietnamese, as the language was obscure in Vietnam.

Demographics
According to the Brazilian government's records, in 1995 there were about 1,000 Vietnamese people living in Brazil. The Vietnamese Embassy disputes this number in Brazil's newest report, citing around 150 to 200 Vietnamese people and their descendants in Brazil at the time of the study. This difference in population figures appeared in other South American countries as well; it has been attributed either to the political and economic situation of the region or to miscalculation from the Vietnamese officials.

Socioeconomic

Many Vietnamese in Brazil sell handmade suitcases, bags, wallets and other personal necessities to earn an income. Of particular note is the footwear brand, Goóc, which was established in 2004 by the Vietnamese Brazilian Thái Quang Nghĩa. Initially making sandals from recycled rubber, Goóc had begun to flourish in the Brazilian market after three years of the brand's establishment and expanded worldwide. With half a million pairs of sandals sold each year, the company's annual revenue – as of the 2014 fiscal year – amounted to approximately $30 million USD. Goóc was featured on CNN International in 2009 as the company began to gain international attention.

Culture
Most people of Vietnamese origin in Brazil still preserve traditional customs, such as celebrating Tết (the lunar new year). Despite a lack of ingredients, traditional Vietnamese foods such as phở, and bánh chưng are still prepared in the traditional fashion. The Vietnamese community in Brazil remains relatively marginalized, in contrast to the social standings of other Overseas Vietnamese communities.

See also

Asian Brazilians

References

Brazilian
Ethnic groups in Brazil